Gustav "Bib" Wagner (April 26, 1901 – January 11, 1972) was a Luxembourgian bobsledder who competed in the 1930s.  He competed in the two-man event at the 1936 Winter Olympics, but crashed out during the fourth run and did not finish. Wagner was born in Luxembourg City.

References
1936 bobsleigh two-man results
1936 Olympic Winter Games official report. - p. 419.
COSL-ALO profile 
Gustav Wagner's profile at Sports Reference.com

1901 births
1972 deaths
Sportspeople from Luxembourg City
Bobsledders at the 1936 Winter Olympics
Luxembourgian male bobsledders
Olympic bobsledders of Luxembourg